Maksim Stoykov (born 13 January 1991) is a Bulgarian footballer who plays as a midfielder.

References

1991 births
Living people
Bulgarian footballers
PFC Litex Lovech players
PFC Slavia Sofia players
PFC Vidima-Rakovski Sevlievo players
First Professional Football League (Bulgaria) players
Second Professional Football League (Bulgaria) players

Association football midfielders